The Breaking of the Drought is a 1920 Australian silent film from director Franklyn Barrett based on the popular play by Bland Holt and Arthur Shirley. According to Graham Phillips, this film is one of the most damaged films in Australia's film archive, although few sequences have severe damage in the film.

Plot

Drought causes Jo Galloway to lose possession of Wallaby Stationn to the bank. He moves to the city with his wife and daughter Marjorie to stay with his son Gilbert only to discover that Gilbert has been embezzling family funds, and fallen in with conman Varsy Lyddleton and femme fatal Olive Lorette.

Lyddleton murders Olive then kills himself. Marjorie's boyfriend Tom Wattleby saves Gilbert from a bushfire, just as the drought breaks, restoring the family's fortunes.

Cast
Trilby Clark as Marjorie Galloway
Dunstan Webb as Tom Wattleby
Charles Beetham as Jo Galloway
Marie La Varre as Olive Lorette
John Faulkner as Varsy Lyddleton
Rawdon Blandford as Gilbert Galloway
Nan Taylor as Mrs Galloway
Arthur Albert as Walter Flour
Ethel Henry as Molly Henderson

Original Play

The film was based on a 1902 Australian play written for Bland Holt by English playwright Arthur Shirley.

Synopsis
In 1902, at drought-stricken Wallaby Station in New South Wales, a squatter, Jo Galloway, lives with his wife and daughter Marjorie while his son Gilbert trains to be a doctor in Sydney. Gilbert falls in with bad company, in the shape of financier Varsey Lyddleton, who encourages him to forge his father's name on some cheques and ruins his family. A neighbouring squatter, Tom Wattleby, who loves Marjorie Galloway, returns from a trip to India to find the father working as a lamp cleaner and the daughter was a maid. The neighbour rescues the family and the father swears vengeance on his son. However, during a bush fire that ends in a heavy rain that breaks the drought, the hero rescues Gilbert.

Reception
The play made its debut at the end of 1902 and was very popular. Audiences and critics were particularly impressed by the stage design, which included things like real horses, recreations of Paddy's Market, swimming pools and real trees.

Annette Kellerman appeared in a 1903 production.

Holt later adapted another play of Shirley's, The Path of Thorns, to an Australian setting, calling it Besieged in Port Arthur.

Production
Bland Holt had refused offers to film his play for a number of years until approached by Barrett and Percy Rea.

Shooting began in December 1919 in Narrabri and Moree, with interiors filmed at a temporary studio at the Theatre Royal in Sydney.

An additional sequence was shot consisting of a water ballet and a diving display by "water nymphs", shot in the National Park near Sydney. This sequence is missing from most versions of the film.

Reception
Female lead Trilby Clark went to the US after filming and worked in theatre and movies.

Controversy
A New South Wales MP, Mr Wearne, asked questions in parliament complaining that the film's depiction of drought could create a bad impression overseas. An investigation was launched by the Chief Secretary's office, who later assured Wearne that new legislation meant that the export of the film could be banned by the Minister of Customs if he deemed it to be "harmful to the Commonwealth".

Lost Film
The film was thought lost until 1976, when several rusty film cans containing it were found under a house in Hornsby.

References

External links
Images of scenes from the film The Breaking of the Drought at State Library Victoria.

[http://aso.gov.au/titles/features/the-breaking-of-the-drought/ The Breaking of the Drought] at Australian Screen Online

1920 films
Australian drama films
Australian silent feature films
Australian black-and-white films
1920s rediscovered films
1920 drama films
Rediscovered Australian films
Films directed by Franklyn Barrett
Silent drama films